"Chariot" is a song by American singer-songwriter Gavin DeGraw. It appears on his 2003 debut studio album, Chariot, and was released as the album's second single in February 2005. The song addresses the overwhelming feeling Gavin felt when he moved to New York from his rural hometown; in the songs, he pleads for a (metaphorical) chariot to come and take him home.

Upon its release, "Chariot" peaked at number 30 on the US Billboard Hot 100 chart in July 2005 and was certified platinum by the Recording Industry Association of America (RIAA). Worldwide, the song reached the top 20 in the Netherlands and Norway and peaked at number 30 on Radio & Records Canadian CHR/Pop Top 30 chart.

Content
DeGraw said on "Chariot":

Music video
The music video for "Chariot" was directed by Zach Braff, who also directed music videos for Joshua Radin. It stars model and actress Jaime King and also features a brief cameo from Donald Faison, who plays the role of Christopher Turk in the TV show Scrubs, in which Braff is also a cast member.

Track listing
European CD single
 "Chariot" (album version) – 3:54
 "W.B.T." – 4:31

Charts

Weekly charts

Year-end charts

Certifications

References

2003 songs
2005 singles
Gavin DeGraw songs
J Records singles
Songs written by Gavin DeGraw
Sony BMG singles